The Public Schools Athletic League, known by the abbreviation PSAL, is an organization that promotes student athletics in the public schools of New York City. It was founded in 1903 to provide and maintain a sports program for students enrolled in New York City public schools. It is the oldest and largest sports league in the United States. The PSAL serves both boys and girls. The PSAL holds competitions in a wide range of indoor and outdoor sports in fall, winter and spring seasons. In 2007, the league included 185 schools involving nearly 2,400 teams.

The mission of the Public Schools Athletic league is to provide opportunities for educating students in physical fitness, character development and socialization skills through an athletic program that fosters teamwork, discipline and sportsmanship.

During the 2014–15 school year, the PSAL distributed approximately $27 million to fund over 45,000 student-athletes at hundreds of New York City schools.

Early history

The genesis of the Public Schools Athletic League (PSAL) came from the appointment in early 1903 of Dr. Luther Halsey Gulick as director of physical training for the New York public school system. Compared to other major cities, the athletics program for the New York boroughs were backwards, underdeveloped, and rife with corruption. Gulick found "semi-truant" boys playing baseball for schools they did not attend, and that there was much unsportsmanlike conduct and dishonesty on the playing fields. Only a small percentage of actual students participated in athletics. He saw a serious need for reform and devised a grandiose plan to form a new league—the PSAL—that would involve most of the student population, grade school and high school, and working with two influential New Yorkers—General George W. Wingate (a member of the City Board of Education) and James E. Sullivan (secretary of the Amateur Athletic Union)—presented it in October 1903 to the superintendent of schools, William H. Maxwell. He, with the concurrence of the school board, approved of Gulick's plan.

Although the PSAL received sanction by the board of education, it was set up as a private corporation that would not receive public tax money. The founders of the league recruited the businessmen of New York City to serve on the league's board of directors and also become paying members of the league, and also solicited contributions from prominent benefactors. The league was organized into 22 districts (expanded to 25 by 1910), in which each district league administered athletic programs for elementary and high schools within their district. One member of each district league served on the Elementary Games committee and one member of each district league served on the High School Games committee. These committees governed all general matters pertaining to the league. Championships were held at the district, borough, and city levels. By 1914, the Board of Education was fully funding the PSAL.

The league began with an athletic extravaganza held at Madison Square Garden on December 26, 1903. It involved 1,040 boys, mostly elementary school students, in basketball and track and field events. Among the high schools, Commerce won the track and field meet and Flushing won the basketball tournament. In the spring the league held its first outdoor high school track and field championship, won by Brooklyn Boys.

Each year thereafter the high school league expanded by adding citywide championships in additional sports. In the school year of 1906-07 cross country and soccer was added, and the 1907–08 school year saw the addition of rifle marksmanship, swimming, tennis, and baseball. The expanded activity of the PSAL served to kill off all the previous leagues by 1908.

Rowing was added in the spring of 1907, and several schools, mainly Commerce and Clinton, competed each Memorial Day in the Harlem Regatta. The schools had difficulty getting the use of shells, however, and in 1915 the PSAL withdrew sponsorship. In the 1909–10, lacrosse was added and after World War I golf, handball, fall rifle marksmanship, and ice hockey were added.

Football was not a part of the league's program in its early years. The PSAL chose not sponsor football, because the intent of the league was to involve the average athlete in athletics, and football was considered a sport for athletic elites. The Long Island, Metropolitan, and various borough leagues continued to run the football championships for a couple or so years. In the fall of 1905 the New York newspapers began crowning schools with the titular "Greater New York" championship in football. This procedure lasted until about the fall of 1913, when the number of football contenders made it impossible to schedule sufficient games to decide on one champion. Thereafter the newspapers contented themselves with crowning borough champions. Finally, the PSAL began sponsoring football competition by boroughs in the fall of 1919, but no official championships were recognized. The newspapers basically crowned the borough champions in football.

The premier athletic powers in the league were spread over the boroughs and in the different sports. In the Bronx one of the premier powers was DeWitt Clinton, which took more than its share of trophies in the basketball, swimming, track and field, tennis, and football. In Manhattan was Stuyvesant, which rivaled Clinton in basketball, swimming, and track and field, and Commerce, which rivaled Clinton in basketball and football. Townsend Harris produced more than its share of swimming championships.

In Brooklyn, Manual Training succeeded Long Island League alumnus Brooklyn Boys' as the borough's power, taking loads of titles in track and field, cross country, lacrosse, and soccer. Another Long Island League alumnus, Erasmus Hall, emerged as a football and swimming power. In the 1920s New Utrecht became the premier power in track and field, taking most of the indoor and outdoor titles that decade. The school continued to dominate the sport well into the 1930s.

Queens produced such powers as Jamaica (in ice hockey and rifle marksmanship), Richmond Hill (in golf), and Flushing (in cross country and track and field). Besides Clinton, the Bronx could boast of Morris, which dominated rifle marksmanship early on and took several national championships, and also did well in soccer and tennis. Evander Childs did well in golf, rifle, swimming, and tennis. On Staten Island (Richmond Borough), Curtis became a power in cross country, golf, and soccer.

In the late 1920s and early 1930s new athletic powers came to the forefront, such as Jefferson, Textile, Brooklyn Technical High School, Monroe, and Madison. Handball and fencing were added to the league program. The Great Depression of the 1930s cut somewhat into the PSAL program, and some sports were discontinued.

Some notable coaches in the PSAL are William Lopez, Jack Dammon, Dwayne "Tiny" Morton, Ruth Lovelace and Robert Sprance.

Sports programs

The following is a list of the sports that the PSAL currently runs under its program

Boys

Fall Sports
 Badminton
 Bowling (Co-Ed)
 Cross Country
 Fencing
 Football
 Soccer

Winter Sports
 Basketball
 Gymnastics
 Indoor Track
 Wrestling
 Swimming
 Table Tennis

Spring Sports
 Baseball
 Cricket (Co-Ed)
 Golf (Co-Ed)
 Handball
 Lacrosse
 Outdoor Track
 Tennis
 Volleyball

Girls

Fall Sports
 Bowling (Co-Ed)
 Cross Country
 Golf
 Tennis
 Soccer
 Swimming
 Volleyball
 Multiple Pathways League (MPL) Volleyball

Winter Sports
 Basketball
 Gymnastics
 Indoor Track
 Table Tennis
 MPL Table Tennis (Co-Ed)

Spring Sports
 Badminton
 Cricket (Co-Ed)
 Flag Football
 Rugby
 Fencing
 Golf (Co-Ed)
 Handball
 Lacrosse
 Outdoor Track
 Softball
 Wrestling
 Stunt

Equitable access disputes 
In August 2006, New York City Public Advocate Betsy Gotbaum released a report titled "Making the Team: Gender Inequality in New York City PSAL Sports Teams." The report stated "all types of high schools favored boys sport teams opportunities" and that "the PSAL sports schedule discriminated against girls." It also stated that several women's sports were scheduled during the "off-season" of that sport, while the men's counterparts played during the traditional season. The report alleged that the PSAL was in violation of Title IX of the Civil Rights Act of 1964. In 2009 the PSAL moved girls' soccer from the spring to the fall season, lining up with the boys' soccer season, after the threat of a lawsuit from the New York Civil Liberties Union on behalf of three athletes. In 2010, the National Women's Law Center filed a lawsuit with the Office for Civil Rights of the United States Department of Education, claiming that the NYCDOE provided inadequate opportunities for female high school sports compared to those for males. The complaint alleged many public high schools in the city did not offer any girls teams in several sports, a violation of Title IX. Other urban school districts involved in the suit included those of Chicago and Houston. In 2015, the ensuing federal investigation concluded that the NYCDOE violated Title IX by failing to provide an equal opportunity for female students to participate in sports.

In May 2014, the founder of the Small Schools Athletic League, David Garcia-Rosen, filed a civil rights complaint with the United States Department Of Education against the PSAL, alleging that they were in violation of Title XI of the Civil Rights Act of 1964. The complaint included dozens of charts that illustrated students who attend schools with the highest percentages of students of color had the fewest opportunities to participate in PSAL sports, while the schools with the most white students had as many as 44 PSAL teams. The New York Times called the PSAL's response to this complaint a "statistical delusion."

At a May 28, 2014 City Council budget hearing, 100 students wearing jerseys inside out presented Deputy Chancellor Grimm with thousands of petitions demanding equitable access to the PSAL for students of color.

In November 2014, Garcia-Rosen filed a second complaint with the US Department of Education's Office of Civil Rights alleging that the PSAL continued to violate Title XI of the Civil Rights Act of 1964 by not providing students of color with equitable access to a diverse range of PSAL sports teams.

On November 20, 2014, student-athlete Jason Puello sued the PSAL in New York State Supreme Court, alleging that the PSAL's age rules are "arbitrary and capricious."

Notable PSAL alumni

Listed below are former PSAL students who are/were involved in professional or college athletics.

Adali E. Stevenson High School
Ed Pinckney (1981) - former NBA player, 1985 NBA Champion

Bronx High School of Science Wolverines
Arthur Bisguier (1947) - chess grandmaster
Jeanette Lee (1989) - professional pool player, No. 1 ranked female pool player in the world
Wolf Wigo (1991) - water polo player and coach, 2x NCAA champion
Benjamin (Benji) Ungar (2004) - fencer

Christopher Columbus Explorers
Izzy Molina (1990) - former MLB player for the Oakland Athletics and Baltimore Orioles
Johnny Monell (2004) - former MLB player for the San Francisco Giants and New York Mets

Curtis High School Warriors
Andrew J. Barberi - former football player and longtime Curtis High coach. Staten Island ferry MV Andrew J. Barberi is named for him.
Irv Constantine - former NFL player who played 1 career game
Terry Crowley - former MLB player, 3x World Series Champion
Dominique Easley - former NFL player, Super Bowl XLIX Champion
Frank Fernández - former MLB player, Yankees, Athletics, Senators, Cubs 
Steve Gregory - former NFL player and current NFL coach
Mouhamadou Gueye - basketball player in the NBA G League
Jack Hynes - Soccer Hall of Fame and MVP of the American Soccer League 
James Jenkins - former NFL player for the Washington Redskins
Halil Kanacevic - basketball player in Italy, Slovenia, Spain, Montenegro, and Greece
Abel Kiviat - former track athlete, Olympic Silver medalist 1912
Shemiah LeGrande - former NFL player
Dino Mangiero - former NFL player
Hassan Martin - basketball player in Japan, Germany, Serbia, Greece, and Montenegro
Elmer Ripley - former basketball player and college coach
Sonny Ruberto - former MLB player and coach
Bobby Thomson - former MLB  player for the New York Giants, famous for "the Shot Heard 'Round the World"
Vernon Turner - former NFL player for the Buffalo Bills
Anthony Varvaro - former MLB player
Isaiah Wilkerson - basketball player in NBA G League, Mexico, Puerto Rico, Finland, and Poland

DeWitt Clinton Governors
Barney Sedran (1909) - former basketball player, Naismith Memorial Basketball Hall of Fame Member
Fred DeStefano (1918) - former NFL player
Tubby Raskin (1919) - former basketball player and coach of the Israel men's national basketball team
George Gregory Jr. (1927) - played college basketball for Columbia University, first black basketball player to be selected as an All American
George Kojac (1927) - swimmer, Olympic Gold Medalist
Lou Bender (1928) - played college basketball for Columbia University, member of the New York City Basketball Hall of Fame
Bernie Fliegel (1934) - professional basketball player, 1942 ABL Champion
Eddie Lopat (1935) - former MLB player, 5x World Series Champion
Ralph Kaplowitz (1937) - former NBA player
Ben Auerbach (1937) - professional basketball player
Sugar Ray Robinson (1938) - boxer, member of the International Boxing Hall of Fame
Leo Gottlieb (1938) - former NBA player for the New York Knicks
Dolph Schayes (1945) - former NBA player, Naismith Memorial Basketball Hall of Fame member
Ed Warner (1948) - former college basketball player, banned by the NBA for his involvement in fixing games
Ozzie Virgil Sr. (1950) - former MLB player, first Dominican to play in Major League Baseball
Jerry Harkness (1959) - former NBA player, has the longest game winning shot in a professional basketball game
Gary Gubner (1960) - professional weightlifter and shot-putter, Olympian
Barry Leibowitz (1964) - former ABA player
Willie Worsley (1964) - former ABA player, 1966 NCAA Champion
Nate Archibald (1966) - former NBA player,  Naismith Memorial Basketball Hall of Fame Member
Luther Green (1966) - former NBA player
Tom Henderson (1969) - former NBA player, Olympic Silver Medalist
Ricky Sobers (1971) - former NBA player, 1st Round Pick in 1975
Steve Sheppard (1973) - former NBA player, Olympic Gold Medalist
Butch Lee (1974) - former NBA player, first Puerto Rican player in NBA history
Pedro Borbón Jr. (1985) - former MLB player, 1995 World Series Champion
Sam Garnes (1992) - former NFL player and coach
Sanjay Ayre (1999) - professional track athlete, Olympic Silver Medalist
Ramon Guzman (2000) - former NFL and CFL player

Evander Childs Educational Campus
Jack Shapiro (1925) - former NFL player, shortest player in NFL history

Harry Truman Mustangs
Stan Jefferson (1980) - former MLB player, joined the NYPD after his MLB career
Rod Strickland (1984) - former NBA player and current college coach

Herbert H. Lehman High School Lions
Bobby Bonilla (1981) - former MLB player, 6x MLB All Star and 1987 World Series Champion
Doug Marrone (1983) - former NFL player and current NFL coach
T. J. Rivera (2006) - former MLB player, represented Puerto Rico at the World Baseball Classic

James Monroe High School
Hank Greenberg (1929) - former MLB player, National Baseball Hall of Fame and Museum Member
Izzy Goldstein (1930) - former MLB player for the Detroit Tigers
Mickey Rutner (1937) - former MLB player for the Philadelphia Athletics
Lennie Rosenbluth (1952) - former NBA player, 1957 NCAA Champion
Ed Kranepool (1962) - former MLB player, 1x All Star and 1969 World Series Champion
Dan Monzon (1964) - former MLB player for the Minnesota Twins
Ellie Rodríguez (1966) - former MLB player, 2x All Star
Wilbur Young (1967) - former NFL player
Darren Carrington (1984) - former NFL player
Malloy Nesmith Sr. (1988) - former professional basketball player in the Dominican Republic, street ball player

John F. Kennedy High School
David Britton (1977) - former NBA player
Miguel Jimenez (1987) - former MLB player for the Oakland Athletics
Angel Estrada (2000) - former Arena Football League player
Stephfon Green (2007) - former NFL player
Dwight Hardy (2007) - former basketball player, played in Italy and Turkey
Karamba Janneh (2007) - former soccer player

Morris High School
Jack Coffey (1905) - former MLB player and college coach
Bernard Opper (1935) - former NBL and ABL player, 2x ABL Champion
Chris Eubank (1984) - boxer, former WBO Middleweight and super-middleweight champion

New Dorp High School Central Cougars
Frank Ferrara - former NFL player
Nick Fotiu - former NHL player
Bill Jankunis - former track athlete
Hurvin McCormack - former NFL player, Super Bowl XXX Champion
Mike Siani - former NFL player and college coach

Port Richmond High School Raiders
Peter Rossomando - current Head Football Coach for Lamar, former college football player
William Shakespeare - College Football Hall of Fame member
Jeff Stoutland - current coach for the Philadelphia Eagles, former college football player

Ralph R. McKee CTE High School Seagulls
Duane Singleton - former MLB player

Staten Island Technical High School Seagulls
Brian Esposito - former MLB player

Susan E. Wagner High School Falcons
Frank Menechino - former MLB player and current MLB coach
Lou Anarumo - Defensive Coordinator for the Cincinnati Bengals

Theodore Roosevelt High School Rough Riders
Rocky Colavito (dropped out in 1947) - former MLB player, 9x MLB All Star
Ben Oglivie (1967) - former MLB player, 3x MLB All Star
Sammy Mejía (2000) - former basketball player, Drafted by the Detroit Pistons in 2007

Tottenville High School Pirates
Emmanuel Akah - former NFL player
Joe Andruzzi - former NFL player, 3x Super Bowl Champion
Gus Edwards - NFL player for the Baltimore Ravens
Zack Granite - former MLB player for the Minnesota Twins
Tom Gregorio - former MLB player and current coach for the Los Angeles Angels
Jason Marquis - former MLB player, 1x MLB All Star
Adewale Ogunleye - former NFL player, 2003 Pro Bowler and 1st Team All Pro
Ricco Rodriguez - former MMA fighter, former UFC heavyweight champion
Rich Scheid - former MLB player

William Howard Taft High School
Irwin Dambrot (1946) - former college basketball player, first round pick by the New York Knicks
Ed Roman (1948) - former college basketball player, banned for life by the NBA
Joe Hammond - former basketball player, drafted by the Los Angeles Lakers
Artie Green (1979) - former basketball player, drafted by the Milwaukee Bucks

References

External links
 

Public education in New York City
High school sports associations in New York (state)
Sports in New York City
1903 establishments in New York City